Stockholm University Library is the research library of the University of Stockholm with one main library and eight unit libraries. Stockholm University Library is one of Sweden's largest research libraries, providing extensive access to e-books and other digital material as well as interlibrary loans. The focus groups are students, researchers and teachers. They have access to the collections of printed as well as online literature, tools for e-publishing of essays, study places, research results and education in information, scientific communication and how to work with references. Stockholm University Library is also a public library with over 1.4 million visitors in 2012.

History 
The university library dates back to 1877 when it started building up its collections of literature and magazines through donations and purchases. The collections were moved between different locations until they were accommodated in the attic of the school Norra Latin. The need for literature increased as the university grew. In 1882 more donations further extended the collection after an appeal had been made. The largest book donations were given by The Royal Library in Copenhagen and the University of Oslo in Norway.

A number of libraries were opened in the city of Stockholm, such as the Socialvetenskapliga biblioteket, Juridiska biblioteket, Slaviska biblioteket and Humanistiska biblioteket. The Humanistiska biblioteket was to become a meeting point for young intellectuals into the 1960s with its location close to Stureplan. In 1971 the faculties of the university all were located to the new Campus in Frescati north of the inner city. At the same time today's university library organisation was founded. Different libraries, such as Riksdagsbiblioteket, Kungliga biblioteket and Vetenskapsakademiens bibliotek continued to be responsible for the purchase of literature throughout the 1970s. In 1978 the university library was given the responsibility of The Library of the Royal Swedish Academy of Sciences (Kungliga vetenskapsakademins bibliotek), founded in 1739, thus giving the library access to one of Europe's largest collections of nature science, including the collections of Carl Linnaeus and Emanuel Swedenborg. The Emanuel Swedenborg Collection was selected as Memory of the Unesco World Register in 2005.

Building
The British-Swedish Architect Ralph Erskine was appointed to create the main library building in 1982. Situated in the University Campus Frescati, it was constructed as an extension of the existing university building Södra huset (The South House) from the 1960s by David Helldén. Erskine created a linkage between the buildings with his trademark, an arched-formed roof, at the same time creating the main entrance of the library. The facades and roof are dominated by concrete and aluminium. The library by Erskine connects with the building Allhuset, made by Erskine in 1981. The university library was inaugurated in January 1983.

Libraries
Stockholm University Library consists of the main library (huvudbiblioteket) and eight section libraries and one more will be opened in 2014.

JMK-biblioteket (Dept. of Media, Journalism, Communication Library)
Asienbiblioteket (Asia Library)
Matematiska biblioteket (Mathematics Library)
Geobibilioteket (Geolibrary)
Biblioteket för Socialt arbete (Dept. of Social Work Library)
Arrheniusbiblioteket (Arrhenius Library)
AlbaNovas bibliotek (AlbaNova Library)
Latinamerikainstitutets bibliotek (Library of the Institute of Latin American Studies)
Nodbiblioteket (Nod Library) - to be opened in 2014

References

External links

Stockholm University Library

Library
Academic libraries in Sweden
Buildings and structures in Stockholm